Brazil observed daylight saving time (DST) (called horário de verão – "summer time" – in Portuguese) in the years of 1931–1933, 1949–1953, 1963–1968 and 1985–2019. Initially it applied to the whole country, but from 1988 it applied only to part of the country, usually the southern regions, where DST is more useful due to a larger seasonal variation in daylight duration.

The most recent DST rule specified advancing the time by one hour during the period from 00:00 on the first Sunday in November to 00:00 on the third Sunday in February (postponed by one week if the latter fell on carnival), applicable only to the South, Southeast and Central-West regions. Brazil abolished DST in 2019.

List of DST observances

Starting and ending dates
DST starting and ending dates were variable and determined by decree, often set for only one year at a time. Until 1968, the starting date was usually the first day of November or December, and the ending date was usually the first day of March or April, without regard to the day of the week. In 1985–1987 the dates were Saturdays, and from 1987 they were usually Sundays, typically from October to February.

The dates were sometimes adjusted to avoid conflicts with certain events. In 1997, the DST starting date was set to a Monday due to the Pope's mass on Sunday during his visit to Brazil. In 2002, 2004 and 2006, the starting date was postponed to the first Sunday or holiday in November due to elections in October and technical difficulties in adjusting the internal clocks of electronic voting machines. In 2007, the DST ending date was postponed to the Sunday after carnival due to the expected economic benefits of observing DST during that holiday.

In 2008, a decree finally fixed the DST schedule for future years, starting on the third Sunday in October and ending on the third Sunday in February, with an exception for postponing the ending date to the following Sunday if the date would otherwise fall on carnival, which occurred in 2012 and 2015.

In 2018, the starting date was changed to the first Sunday in November to avoid interfering with elections in October. This time there was no technical difficulty, but a desire to shorten the difference in poll closing times between regions with and without DST. Although it was a permanent change to the DST schedule, it was only observed that year as Brazil abolished DST altogether in 2019.

Time changes were almost always done at midnight. The time was advanced from 00:00 to 01:00 on the DST starting date and reduced from 00:00 on the ending date to 23:00 of the previous day. Exceptions were the first DST starting time in 1931 (11:00) and the ending times in 1950 and 1966 (01:00).

Regional application

Until 1988, in every year that DST was observed it applied to whole country. In 1963 the Southeast region started DST earlier than the rest of the country.

From 1988, DST was typically limited to the South, Southeast and Central-West regions, and was occasionally extended to some other states such as Bahia and Tocantins. In 2000, DST was extended to all states in the Northeast region but was quickly canceled in most of them due to strong local opposition.

References

See also
 Time in Brazil
 Daylight saving time by country

Brazil
Time in Brazil
1931 introductions